Philip Dunton Murphy (born August 16, 1957) is an American financier, diplomat, and politician serving as the 56th governor of New Jersey since January 2018. A member of the Democratic Party, he served as the United States ambassador to Germany from 2009 to 2013 under President Barack Obama.

Murphy had a 23-year career at Goldman Sachs, where he held several high-level positions and accumulated considerable wealth before retiring in 2006. He is involved in many civic organizations and philanthropic pursuits. He served as finance chairman for the Democratic National Committee in the mid-late 2000s under Howard Dean. In the Obama administration, Murphy served as the United States ambassador to Germany from 2009 to 2013, during which time he dealt with the international fallout from the United States diplomatic cables leak.

While planning to run for governor, Murphy and his wife Tammy Murphy launched New Start New Jersey, a progressive organization active from November 2014 to December 2017, intended to increase his political visibility in the state. He defeated then-Lieutenant Governor Kim Guadagno in the 2017 gubernatorial election. In December 2019, Murphy became the chairperson of the Democratic Governors Association, a position he held for a year. He was reelected in 2021, defeating Republican nominee Jack Ciattarelli with 51% of the vote and becoming the first Democratic governor of New Jersey to win a second term since 1977. In July 2022, Murphy became the first National Governors Association chair from New Jersey.

Early life and education

Murphy was born in Needham, Massachusetts, and was raised in both Needham and nearby Newton, the son of Dorothy Louise (Dunton) and Walter F. Murphy.

The family was Irish American, with Phil being third generation. According to Murphy, his household was "middle class on a good day;" by his recollection, his mother, a secretary, and father, a high-school dropout who took any job he could (including liquor store manager and for-pay pallbearer), lived paycheck to paycheck.

Both of his parents were enthusiastic supporters of John F. Kennedy and volunteered for his campaign in the 1952 United States Senate election in Massachusetts. Murphy played soccer as a boy, an interest that stayed with him in later life. His mother believed strongly in the importance of education, and Phil and his three older siblings all earned college degrees.

Murphy graduated from Needham High School, along with former Massachusetts Governor Charlie Baker, in 1975. He graduated from Harvard University in 1979 with an AB degree in economics. At Harvard he aspired to become a professional musical theater performer and was elected president of the Hasty Pudding Theatricals, a theatrical student society. He then attended the University of Pennsylvania's Wharton School, where he received a MBA in 1983.

Career

Personal wealth
Murphy's position at Goldman Sachs when the firm had its IPO brought his net worth above $50 million. By one estimate, reported in Der Spiegel in 2009, his wealth after leaving the firm was in the range of several hundred million dollars.

Murphy moved to Middletown Township, New Jersey, in the late 1990s. He and his family live in a riverside estate with a six-figure annual property tax bill. Murphy also owns homes in Germany and Italy.

In 2016 Murphy released five years' worth of federal tax returns. In 2014 he earned about $6 million, paid about $2 million in taxes for an effective tax rate of 34%, and directly or indirectly donated 24% of his income to charity. The returns for the other years showed effective tax rates ranging between 32% and 39%. Murphy's charitable donations during these five years averaged about $980,000 a year. Due to his wealth and the complicated nature of his holdings, his federal tax filings have been known to exceed 300 pages in length.

Finance career

Goldman Sachs
Murphy began his career with a summer associate internship at Goldman Sachs in 1982. He was hired after graduating in 1983. He rose in the ranks quickly, later attributing that success to his ability to make deals: "Two people may not like each other and can't work together. Their mutual dislike is their problem. I don't let it become mine. I'll be the man in the middle and the three of us can work out something everybody is happy with."

From 1993 to 1997 Murphy headed the firm's Frankfurt office. His business responsibilities were later expanded to encompass Germany, Switzerland, and Austria, as well as in the emerging post-Warsaw Pact economies of Central Europe. In this role he engaged in a number of transactions with the German government's Treuhandanstalt agency, whose purpose was to conduct the privatization of formerly state-owned enterprises within the boundaries of no-longer-extant East Germany. Murphy was also active in the Atlantik-Brücke organization, including co-founding its International Advisor Council.

From 1997 to 1999 Murphy served as the President of Goldman Sachs (Asia). In that capacity, he was officed in Hong Kong. During this time Goldman Sachs profited from its investment in Yue Yuen Industrial Holdings, a shoe manufacturer that became notorious for its harsh labor practices. The $55 million investment was made the year before Murphy took the Asia post and it is unclear to what extent Murphy was aware of the firm's operational characteristics. In 1998 Murphy told the Wall Street Journal that "We [at Goldman Sachs] are elite in the sense the Marine Corps is elite".

In 1999 Murphy secured a spot on the firm's Management Committee. There his colleagues included Hank Paulson and Gary Cohn, both of whom later served at highest levels of the federal government. This coincided with the repeal of Glass–Steagall; the repeal allowed Murphy and his colleagues to make much greater use of leverage and profoundly changed how the company generated profits.

In 2001 Murphy became global co-head of the firm's Investment Management Division. This unit oversaw the investments of foundations, pensions, hedge funds, and wealthy personages, and by 2003 had amassed $373 billion in holdings. Hedge funds, in particular, received large lines of credit from Murphy's unit. Another company initiative that Murphy helped to undertake was the unit that did major business in the emerging markets within the EMEA region.

In 2003 Murphy's day-to-day responsibilities at the firm ended, and he became a Senior Director of the firm. He retired in 2005–06. Murphy spent 23 years at Goldman Sachs in all.

Democratic Party finance chair
After leaving Goldman Sachs, Murphy served from 2006 to 2009 as the National Finance Chair of the Democratic National Committee (DNC), where he worked with DNC Chair Howard Dean. Murphy liked both Dean's vision for the party and the discipline Dean brought to the task, and the two became close friends.

It was Murphy who financed Dean's "50-state strategy". The strategy was opposed by powerful Democrats in Congress such as Charles Schumer and Rahm Emanuel, but Murphy refused to visibly engage in this dispute, saying, "I'm a sucker for the view that you have it out in the locker room, not in public."  Former Goldman Sachs colleague and U.S. Secretary of the Treasury Robert Rubin said of Murphy's ability to handle the new position, "He has very substantial technical expertise from his corporate finance work, but he combines that with a wonderful facility for dealing with people." Dean later said that Murphy well learned the lesson not all such figures of commerce understand: that while in business you can command people to do things, in politics things are never so simple.

During his first year, Murphy focused on gaining donations from his contacts from his university years and Goldman Sachs; within that year he was able to substantially reduce the DNC's gap with the Republican National Committee. In all, Murphy says he raised $300 million for the DNC.

Murphy was also a big donor to Democratic candidates, giving them almost $1.5 million by 2009. This included modest contributions to individual candidates and several six-figure sums to party committees. During the hotly contested 2008 Democratic presidential primaries he was a superdelegate but remained uncommitted for most of the contest.

Civic activities

Murphy has been appointed to the boards or committees of various civic or philanthropic groups. Among these are the NAACP, the Local Initiatives Support Corporation, the Center for American Progress, 180 Turning Lives Around, and several programs of the University of Pennsylvania such as the Huntsman Program in International Studies and Business and the Wharton School Graduate Executive and Asian Program. Other such entities include the Goldman Sachs Foundation, the Investment Company Institute, and Prosperity New Jersey. He has served as the grand marshal of the St. Patrick's Day Parade in Rumson, New Jersey, several times.

Murphy has helped lead local charities to support troubled teens and domestic abuse survivors. He and his wife founded 2nd Floor, a teen helpline in New Jersey that had fielded 700,000 calls by 2015 and that has helped save lives.

In 2004-05 Murphy co-chaired a national task force on 21st-century public education for the Center for American Progress that featured fellow co-chairs Governor of Arizona Janet Napolitano and academic and civil rights figure Roger Wilkins.
The Renewing Our Schools, Securing Our Future task force issued a report called "Getting Smarter, Becoming Fairer: A Progressive Education Agenda For A Stronger Nation". It called for a longer school day, a reorganized school year, and extending learning scenarios to the pre-kindergarten and post-high school domains.

The Murphy family's time in Germany made them all soccer enthusiasts. Murphy has served on the boards of the U.S. Soccer Foundation and the U.S. Soccer Federation World Cup Bid Committee for 2018 and 2022. He owns a stake in the professional New Jersey women's soccer club NJ/NY Gotham FC; he has said that he knows the club is a money-losing venture but that he wanted to show his soccer-playing daughter that women's professional soccer can exist in the United States.

New Jersey Benefits Task Force chair
In May 2005 Acting Governor Richard Codey named Murphy to chair the New Jersey Benefits Task Force on public sector employee benefits in response to the New Jersey pension crisis, a particularly long-running instance of the state-level pensions crises taking place nationwide.

The task force reported its findings in December 2005. By this time Murphy was already considered to be retired from Goldman Sachs. The report decried past state practices, saying that "gimmicks" had been constructed instead of genuine solutions.

As chair, Murphy recommended the sale of publicly owned assets. For the most part that did not happen, but some of his other suggestions, such as raising the age of retirement and recalculating how pensions related to salary earned, were taken. Labor unions opposed the recommendations, with leader Carla Katz saying, "We will fight vigorously and loudly against any cuts to our pensions or health benefits proposed by the task force." The New York Times wrote that "no matter what happens, the report's legacy may well be that it tried to tackle the issues head-on."

U.S. Ambassador to Germany

Murphy served as United States Ambassador to Germany under President Barack Obama from 2009 to 2013. The possibility of his being named to the post was first reported by Spiegel Online International in May 2009. The former U.S. Ambassador John Kornblum supported the choice, saying, "Murphy has been involved in German-American relations for many years. He's a good choice." An agrément was issued, and Obama formally nominated him to the position on July 9. Murphy was confirmed by the United States Senate on August 7, and appeared with his family in Berlin on August 21. That they arrived in an expensive Gulfstream V executive jet irked Chancellor Merkel, who saw it as evidence of the long practice of presidents awarding wealthy donors with ambassadorships. Murphy presented his credentials in Berlin to German President Horst Koehler on September 3, which the State Department considers his effective start date. He was sworn into the position on September 13.

During his tenure, Murphy promoted American trade and focused on engaging Germany's youth through town hall meetings, exchange programs, and social media communication. He said, "The legacy of our time together in Germany will be measured by how well we 'set the table' for tomorrow, by how deeply today's youth understand the ongoing relevance of the transatlantic bridge. They are tomorrow's leaders and our investment in their future is our highest priority." In doing so he paid particular attention to children who had immigrated to Germany, who rarely had the opportunity to meet Americans.

The United States diplomatic cables leak, published by WikiLeaks in 2010, contained negative statements Murphy signed about senior German politicians, including a remark by Murphy that Merkel was "insecure" and unfavorable comments by embassy staff about Guido Westerwelle, the German foreign minister. Some German officials expressed desire that Murphy be recalled. In response, Murphy appeared on German television outlets such as ZDF in an attempt at damage control. In Spiegel Online, he said, "I'm a big boy. At the end of the day, the buck stops with me," and that he would not "apologize for one speck" of what his staff had done. On December 5, he apologized for the leak in Welt am Sonntag. Murphy later said that the episode was "incredibly awkward and embarrassing" but that the two countries worked through it, and that in the end Germany-United States relations were stronger than ever.

Regarding the European debt crisis, Murphy said in 2013, "The big debate in Europe, which I think is a false debate, is either fiscal consolidation or growth. And the reality is that Europe needs both: it needs fiscal consolidation and growth." Regarding economic differences between the nations, he said, "Germany believes strongly that the first order of business is to cut your debts and deficits and from that, good things will come. We're more likely to say a little bit of stimulus will jump-start things, even if it means incurring more debt. But you work your way through those issues."

On May 29, 2013, it was announced that Murphy was stepping down from the post. He was still ambassador as of July 3; he returned to the United States at some point during July and formally stayed in the role until his mission terminated on August 26.

Entry into New Jersey politics
Murphy was mentioned as a potential candidate in the 2013 New Jersey gubernatorial election, but did not run. Rather, upon returning to the United States he returned to Murphy Endeavors LLC, a business management consultancy firm, of which he was the principal, with offices in Red Bank, New Jersey. He started the firm in 2009 after leaving the DNC position, but it was soon put on hold due to his ambassadorial nomination. He also gave speeches about his experiences in Germany, especially in connection with the 25th anniversary of the fall of the Berlin Wall.

New Start New Jersey
In 2014 Murphy created New Start New Jersey, a nonprofit progressive policy think tank that held a number of events around New Jersey. His wife was co-founder, chair, and secretary. The organization said it would neither endorse nor fund political candidates, as it was barred from doing so, but it did serve to raise Murphy's political visibility. Its events included an appearance by singer Jon Bon Jovi. One of its goals was to help displaced workers back into the work force. (Making reference to visibility, in 2016 hacked Podesta emails revealed that Murphy was already seriously considering a run for governor when the organization was founded, telling Podesta that his ambitions were "very serious but not yet committed" and that the new entity would improve his name recognition.)

New Way for New Jersey
In September 2015 Murphy launched a progressive organization named New Way for New Jersey, which held a number of town halls, including some by telephone on Sunday evenings, and encouraged Democrats to sign petitions critical of incumbent Governor Chris Christie. Unlike New Start New Jersey, New Way for New Jersey was an explicitly political organization.

Criticism of Chris Christie
On March 2, 2016, Murphy's organization New Way for New Jersey launched a petition that criticized Christie for neglecting his duties as governor due to his travel and support of Donald Trump's presidential campaign. The group implored Christie to "do your job or quit". Murphy supported Hillary Clinton in the 2016 Democratic primary and fundraised for her.

After Murphy announced his candidacy for governor, New Way for New Jersey folded. New Start New Jersey continued, albeit without Murphy on its board.

Campaigns for governor

2017 

In May 2016 Murphy announced his candidacy for the Democratic nomination in the 2017 New Jersey gubernatorial election. He became the race's first announced candidate. He said of his rationale, "I am running for governor because New Jersey desperately needs adult leadership that puts our people first."

Announcing so early was unusual. Comparisons with unpopular former governor Jon Corzine, another wealthy former Goldman Sachs executive, were a challenge Murphy had to meet. Murphy also began the campaign with little name recognition. He initially planned to lend $10 million to the campaign but to also aggressively fund-raise. He said he would accept no so-called dark money and that "I'm holding our campaign to a higher standard."

Democratic primary

Murphy was the first declared Democratic candidate for governor, although several other candidates were expected to run. Jersey City Mayor Steven Fulop, Assemblyman John Wisniewski of Sayreville, State Senator Raymond Lesniak, and State Senate President Stephen M. Sweeney of Gloucester County were often mentioned in news media along with other candidates. Fulop and Sweeney were geographic rivals, and in terms of state party organizational support, Max Pizarro of the New York Observer characterized Murphy as "everyone's number two choice. If Fulop or Sweeney stumbles, Murphy could rocket from zero to 100 overnight."

On September 28, 2016, Fulop announced he would not run for governor and endorsed Murphy. On October 6, Sweeney announced he too would not run, citing apparent party support for Murphy, whom he endorsed. The move came as Murphy was corralling dozens of endorsements, including all of those from North Jersey county party committees and the most populous Central Jersey county committees.

As a result of these withdrawals Murphy became the clear front-runner for the nomination, but Wisniewski and Lesniak, the two best-known remaining potential candidates, both said they still intended to run.

After the unexpected result of the 2016 United States presidential election, Murphy noted that the fortunes of the state Democratic Party had improved in the election, saying, "As with so many, I am disappointed by the [presidential] results from Tuesday. But I refuse to be discouraged. And I won't be dissuaded from working to make New Jersey a fairer, more just place for all of us." Murphy subsequently drew criticism from the New Jersey Lieutenant Governor and Republican candidate for governor, Kim Guadagno, for seeming to draw a comparison between the Trump campaign and the early years of the Nazi rise to power in Germany.

On November 15, Wisniewski, who gained visibility as a leader of the Fort Lee lane closure scandal investigations, announced his run for governor. In his message he implicitly criticized Murphy, saying "I'm not a Wall Street executive. I haven't made hundreds of millions of dollars by outsourcing jobs. I've learned the value of public service..."

In January 2017 Murphy was endorsed by New Jersey's two U.S. senators, Bob Menendez and Cory Booker. He also had the endorsements of all 21 county party organizations. In statewide races, these designations offer favorable ballot position, which some voters pick by default, and are often central to success.

By February 2017 Murphy was leading by a solid margin in a Quinnipiac Poll both for the Democratic nomination and in a putative general election matchup against Guadagno. Another poll was less certain, showing most voters undecided.

Two debates with his main Democratic rivals, including former U.S. Treasury official Jim Johnson along with Wiesiewski and Lesniak, were held within a short span of time in May; during the second Murphy found himself under sustained attack by his rivals, but defended himself by staking out very progressive positions. Politico wrote, "Underdogs Jim Johnson, Ray Lesniak and John Wisniewski savaged the front-runner, Phil Murphy, accusing him during the 90-minute televised contest of buying off party bosses and being disingenuous on environmental issues." Subsequent campaigning by those three continued to emphasize that Murphy was "buying" the election. Nonetheless, polls continued to show Murphy with a sizable lead over all rivals.

With $19 million raised, of which $15 million was his own money, Murphy continued to spend the most of all the candidates; his spending was more than twice that of all the other Democratic and Republican candidates for governor combined. He also donated $1.5 million to the various county party organizations as well as to some candidates for local offices. Murphy captured the endorsement of the first major national figure to inject himself into the race, former Vice President Joe Biden. Additionally, he was endorsed by former Vice President Al Gore, which helped solidify Murphy's environmentalist credentials after some attacks on his role as a financier investing in fracking operations. He also had the fundraising support of wealthy entertainment figures Jon Bon Jovi and Whoopi Goldberg. Most, though not all, of the key labor unions in the state, also supported Murphy. Nevertheless, there was still a sense of apathy about the election on the part of the state's voters; as the New York Times stated shortly before the primary vote, "a majority of voters still say they 'don't know' who to vote for and are not doing much to find out."

Murphy won the June 6 primary decisively, with 48% of the vote. Johnson and Wisniewski finished second and third with 22% apiece, Lesniak got 5%, and scattered others less.

General election 
Murphy faced Guadagno, the Republican nominee, in the November general election. In that campaign Guadagno ran as a moderate, attempting to avoid association with both Christie, who held a record-low approval rating for a governor, and Donald Trump. Instead she sought to focus on Murphy's Goldman Sachs background.

On July 26 Murphy announced Assemblywoman and Speaker Emerita Sheila Oliver as his running mate.

Policy proposals

State bank: Murphy's campaign has suggested a North Dakota-style statewide investment bank as a way of boosting New Jersey's economy. The bank would supply loans to not just businesses but also college students. Moreover, it would have the effect of eliminating Wall Street firms – including his own former one – from participating in state financial activities.
Pensions: regarding the state's still-troubled pension system, Murphy has said that there are no easy answers but that "the state has to stand up for its side of the bargain. Period. If the state doesn't, there is no use having the second-paragraph discussion."
Marijuana: Murphy favors the legalization of recreational marijuana in New Jersey.
Minimum wage: In terms of employment under the law, Murphy supports the notion of a $15 minimum wage. He also favors guaranteed paid sick leave in New Jersey.
Affordable housing/builder's remedy debate: In summer 2017, amid heavy local outcry over overdevelopment of apartment complexes and concerns about wealthy developers exploiting the Mount Laurel doctrine to overbuild small towns, Murphy proposed a solution that would not require more forced building. "With smart investments, we can create thousands of units of much-needed affordable housing without building a single new building," he said.
 School desegregation. In 2018, members of Murphy's transition team filed a school desegregation lawsuit, Latino Action Network v. New Jersey.

2021 

On October 1, 2020, Murphy announced he would seek reelection, with Oliver as his running mate. He ran unopposed in the 2021 Democratic primary after two challengers were disqualified. He defeated Republican nominee Jack Ciattarelli in the general election. Murphy became New Jersey's first Democratic governor since Brendan Byrne to be reelected.

Governor of New Jersey

Tenure

2018 

On January 16, 2018, Murphy was sworn in as the 56th governor of New Jersey at the Trenton War Memorial, succeeding Chris Christie. In one of his first executive orders, Murphy signed to revive subsidies for wind power in the state. The following month he signed legislation committing New Jersey to the Paris Agreement — an international treaty on climate change.
 Murphy also ensured that the state sued the U.S. Environmental Protection Agency for suspending the Clean Water Rule. In March, he signed legislation which automatically registers all those who apply for a driver's license or state ID to vote. In April 2018, a poll found that Murphy was popular with the majority of New Jersey residents, with 44% approving and 28% disapproving of his performance as governor; another 28% stated they did not have an opinion on Murphy. By June, Murphy had signed legislation to permit sports betting in the state. In December, Murphy signed into law new legislation which would overhaul the way NJ Transit managed.

2019 
In February 2019, a Monmouth University survey found that Murphy's approval rating had slumped to 43%, with his disapproval rating rising up to 40%. In April, Murphy signed a law allowing terminally ill patients with less than six months to choose to have their lives ended with the assistance of a doctor. In May, Murphy signed legislation which expanded the time period during which alleged sexual assault victims could sue their alleged attackers. A Monmouth University survey conducted in September found that 41% of New Jersey residents approved of Murphy verses 38% who disapproved. Another survey conducted showed that 31% stated that Murphy's polices have hurt the middle-class in the state, while only 17% said that they have benefited. Murphy had opposed construction of a new power plant in New Jersey Meadowlands in North Bergen, stating this in October.

2020 

Murphy's governorship in 2020 was dominated by the COVID-19 pandemic. The first case in the state was reported on March 5, and Murphy declared a state of emergency on March 9. He signed multiple executive orders in late March which ordered a lockdown of the whole state. By April, most schools and businesses had completely shut down, with students being required to learn from home. By the summer, Murphy had reopened most restaurants but imposed extensive mask mandates. By July, COVID-related deaths in the state neared 16,000 and over 100,000 residents had tested positive. A Fairleigh Dickinson University poll conducted in July found that Murphy's approval rating had increased to 67%, with his handling of the pandemic being credited for his strong performance.

In the 2020 United States presidential election, Murphy initially endorsed New Jersey senator Cory Booker for the Democratic nomination after Booker announced his candidacy in January 2019. After Booker dropped out of the race in January 2020, Murphy announced he did not intend on endorsing any of the other candidates still in the race. After former vice president Joe Biden won the nomination, Murphy endorsed Biden.

2021 
Murphy began 2021 with fairly positive approval ratings, ranging in the 50s. In June, Murphy signed an executive order ending the public health emergency for COVID, while retaining some executive privileges and restrictions. After winning reelection in November, Murphy stated he intended on having every kid in school by winter.

2022 
In July 2022, Murphy was elected chair of the National Governors Association, becoming the first person from New Jersey to hold the office.

Awards and honors
In 2015, Murphy received an honorary degree from Hamilton College. In 2019, he received an honorary degree from Rutgers University.

 2022 Knight Commander's Cross of the Order of Merit of the Federal Republic of Germany

Personal life
Murphy first met his future wife, Tammy Snyder, in 1987 when they both worked at Goldman Sachs, but Murphy did not ask her out for another six years. When he finally did, things progressed quickly: they became engaged 18 days later and were married within six months, in 1993.

Murphy and his wife have four children, three sons and a daughter. They live in Monmouth County in New Jersey. The children have been educated at Rumson Country Day School and Phillips Academy. Tammy Snyder Murphy has held a variety of financial, civic, and political positions as well as having been a homemaker.

Murphy and his wife are part owners of NJ/NY Gotham FC (formerly Sky Blue FC), a professional women's soccer team. In 2018, media outlets reported that the team was "plagued by poor housing, subpar facilities, and mismanagement."

On March 4, 2020, Murphy underwent surgery in New York City to remove cancerous tumors in his kidneys. He made a full recovery shortly afterward.

Electoral history

References

Further reading
Final report of the New Jersey Benefits Task Force. December 1, 2005

External links

 Governor Phil Murphy official government website
 Murphy for Governor campaign website

United States Diplomatic Mission to Germany: The Ambassador (archived)

|-

|-

|-

|-

|-

|-

|-
{{s-aft|after=Otherwise 
|-

1957 births
20th-century American businesspeople
21st-century American businesspeople
21st-century American politicians
Ambassadors of the United States to Germany
American financiers
American people of Irish descent
American philanthropists
Businesspeople from Massachusetts
Businesspeople from New Jersey
Center for American Progress people
Democratic Party governors of New Jersey
Goldman Sachs people
Hasty Pudding alumni
Living people
NJ/NY Gotham FC owners
People from Greater Boston
People from Middletown Township, New Jersey
Politicians from Needham, Massachusetts
Sports owners
United States Soccer Federation officials
Wharton School of the University of Pennsylvania alumni
21st-century American diplomats